Mide-Sun is the second album by Canadian singer-songwriter Wab Kinew.

Track listing

References

2010 albums
Wab Kinew albums